Uridine diphosphate N-acetylgalactosamine or UDP-GalNAc is a nucleotide sugar. It is used by glycosyltransferases to transfer N-acetylgalactosamine residues to substrates.

See also
 Galactosamine
 Globoside
 N-Acetylgalactosamine
 (N-Acetylglucosamine) GlcNAc

References

Acetamides
Hexosamines
Membrane biology